Hałoŭčyn (or Holowczyn, Holovchin, Golovchin) is a village in the Białyničy Raion in the Mahiloŭ Region in Belarus.
The total population is 511 inhabitants. It is located 18 kilometers northeast of Białyničy and 26 kilometers from Mahiloŭ.

History
In July 1708, the Battle of Holowczyn was fought between the Russian forces, and the Swedish army, led by Charles XII of Sweden.

Around 70 Jews used to live in the village before World War II. In October 1941, around 19 Jewish men were shot in a mass execution perpetrated by an Einsatzgruppen. The other Jews were sent to another ghetto, probably in Białyničy.

References

Populated places in Mogilev Region
Villages in Belarus
Byalynichy District
Vitebsk Voivodeship
Mogilyovsky Uyezd (Mogilev Governorate)
Jewish Belarusian history
Holocaust locations in Belarus